Jillian Harmon (born 3 March 1987) is an American-New Zealand professional basketball player.

Career

College
After four years of high school basketball for Lakeridge High School in Lake Oswego, Oregon, Harmon then played college basketball for the Stanford Cardinal in Stanford, California, participating in NCAA Division I. During her time at Stanford, Harmon reached the Final Four twice.

Stanford statistics

Source

Europe
After her college career, Harmon first signed with Pool Comense for the 2009–10 season of Italy's Serie A1. In 2012, Harmon would make the move to Lavezzini Parma. After a season abroad in Australia and New Zealand, Harmon returned to Italy after signing with Le Mura Lucca. In 2017, Harmon won her first championship with Lucca.

Australia
Harmon was signed for the 2014–15 WNBL season with the Townsville Fire. Playing alongside the likes of Suzy Batkovic, Micaela Cocks and Cayla George, Harmon helped lead the Fire to their first WNBL championship.

National team
In 2008, Harmon tried out for the New Zealand national team after learning she was eligible because her mother was born in New Zealand. Harmon and former Stanford teammate Clare Bodensteiner were both named to the team shortly before the Olympics. Harmon made her international debut for the Tall Ferns at the 2008 Olympics.

In 2011, Harmon took home the silver medal at the 2011 FIBA Oceania Championship. After taking home the silver, Harmon and the Tall Ferns would then go on to participate in the Olympic Qualifying Tournament in Turkey. After losses to Argentina and the Czech Republic, they failed to qualify.

In 2016, Harmon would once again join the Tall Ferns and compete in the Olympic Qualifying Tournament, with this edition in France. However, they failed to qualify again.

External links

References

1987 births
Living people
Basketball players from New York City
New Zealand women's basketball players
New Zealand expatriate basketball people in Australia
Forwards (basketball)
Basketball players at the 2008 Summer Olympics
Sportspeople from Lake Oswego, Oregon
Olympic basketball players of New Zealand
Stanford Cardinal women's basketball players
Lakeridge High School alumni
American expatriate basketball people in Italy
American people of New Zealand descent
American women's basketball players
Basketball players from Oregon
New Zealand expatriate sportspeople in Italy
New Zealand people of American descent